Manhyia is a town in the Eastern Region of Ghana.

Manhyia may also refer to:

Manhyia (Ghana parliament constituency)
Manhyia Palace Official residence of the Asantehene
Manhyia Palace Museum